Le Petit Cirque et autres contes (The Little Circus and Other Tales) is a 1994 French package film. It is 50 minutes long and contains the following seven short films for young children and their families from the Folimage studio:
 Au clair de la lune, a stop motion animation by Pascal Le Nôtre
 Le Petit Cirque de toutes les couleurs, a stop motion animation by Jacques-Rémy Girerd
 Nos adieux au music-hall, a pastamation by Laurent Pouvaret
 Le Prince des joyaux, a silhouette animation by Michel Ocelot
 Le Wall, a clay animation by Jean-Loup Felicioli
 Paroles en l'air, a traditional animation in charcoal by Sylvain Vincendeau
 Le Moine et le poisson, a traditional animation in India ink by Michaël Dudok de Wit

Notes

1994 films
French children's films
1990s French animated films
Animated anthology films
Folimage films
1990s children's animated films
1994 animated films
Films directed by Jacques-Rémy Girerd
1990s French films